Hugh W. Howard III is a retired United States Navy rear admiral who commanded the United States Naval Special Warfare Command from September 11, 2020 until August 19, 2022. He was previously the Commander of Special Operations Command Central from July 19, 2018, to July 20, 2020.

Military career
Howard graduated from the Naval Academy in 1990 and received a commission as an Ensign in the United States Navy. He volunteered for Basic Underwater Demolition/SEAL training at Naval Amphibious Base Coronado and graduated with BUD/S class 172 in February 1991. His first operational assignment was with SEAL Team EIGHT at Naval Amphibious Base Little Creek. Following SEAL Tactical Training (STT) and completion of six month probationary period, he received the 1130 designator as a Naval Special Warfare Officer, entitled to wear the Special Warfare insignia also known as "SEAL Trident". In 1998, Howard volunteered for assignment to Naval Special Warfare Development Group (commonly known as DEVGRU or SEAL Team Six), in Dam Neck, Virginia and completed a specialized selection and training course. He then served with the command as troop commander, squadron operations officer until 2003 during which time he planned, rehearsed and operated during classified exercises and operations. Howard served with JSOC as operations officer in 2005. Howard later returned to DEVGRU in 2006 as squadron commander of Red Squadron till 2009. At DEVGRU he also held numerous leadership positions including squadron operations officer, deputy commanding officer and commanding officer of Naval Special Warfare Development Group from 2011-2013. Howard earned a Master of Arts degree at the Naval War College in 2010. He recently commanded Special Operations Command Central, MacDill Air Force Base, Florida from 2018 to 2020 following assignment as assistant commander, Joint Special Operations Command, Fort Bragg, North Carolina from 2016 to 2018.
Howard’s awards include the Silver Star, four Bronze Stars with Combat Distinguishing Device, six Defense Superior Service Medals, three Legions of Merit, the Navy Combat Actions Ribbon, five Presidential Unit Citations, and four Joint Meritorious Unit Awards.

Awards and decorations

References

External links

Year of birth missing (living people)
Living people
Place of birth missing (living people)
United States Navy admirals
SEAL Team Six personnel